The Alfa Romeo RM was produced between 1923 and 1925, based on the RL model. It was introduced for the first time at the 1923 Paris Motor Show and total production was around 500 cars. As were most of Alfa Romeo's cars, this was also used in motorsports. Three versions were made: Normal, Sport and Unificato. Sport had a raised compression ratio, and Unificato had longer wheelbase and a slightly bigger engine.

Alfa Romeo half-track 
A very rare half-track version based on the RM was built in the 1920s. The half-track used the RM's inline-four engine modified to work with dry sump lubrication. The track used was licensed to Citroën Kegresse; only one example is known to survive.

Notes

References

RM
Cars introduced in 1923

de:Alfa Romeo RL/RM